Steve Aldo One (born 5 January 1995) is a Cameroonian footballer who plays for Spanish club CE L'Hospitalet as a central defender.

Club career
Born in Yaoundé, One moved to Spain at the age of ten and represented RCD Mallorca as a youth. He made his senior debut with the reserves on 16 December 2012, starting in a 0–1 Segunda División B away loss against UE Sant Andreu.

One scored his first senior goal on 12 October 2014, netting his team's third in a 4–2 away defeat of Real Zaragoza B. In February 2016, he suffered a severe knee injury which took him out for seven months.

On 7 July 2017, One moved to another reserve team, Deportivo Fabril also in the third division. He made his first team debut on 29 November, starting in a 3–2 win at UD Las Palmas for the season's Copa del Rey.

One made his La Liga debut on 21 January 2018, starting in a 1–7 away loss against Real Madrid.

References

External links

1995 births
Living people
Footballers from Mallorca
Cameroonian footballers
Association football defenders
La Liga players
Segunda División B players
Tercera División players
RCD Mallorca B players
Deportivo Fabril players
Deportivo de La Coruña players
Salamanca CF UDS players
CE L'Hospitalet players
Cameroonian expatriate footballers
Cameroonian expatriate sportspeople in Spain
Expatriate footballers in Spain